Andrei Olegovich Volgin (born 28 June 1988) is a Russian professional football player.

Club career
He made his Russian Football National League debut for FC Metallurg-Kuzbass Novokuznetsk on 10 July 2012 in a game against FC Neftekhimik Nizhnekamsk.

External links
 
 

1988 births
People from Kemerovo
Living people
Russian footballers
Association football midfielders
FC Tyumen players
FC Tom Tomsk players
FC Novokuznetsk players
FC Chita players